Mabra haematophaga is a moth in the family Crambidae. It was described by Hans Bänziger in 1985. It is found in Thailand.

References

Moths described in 1985
Pyraustinae